Joostella atrarenae is a Gram-negative and motile bacterium from the genus of Joostella which has been isolated from black sea sand from the Jeju Island.

References

Flavobacteria
Bacteria described in 2011